Prince Alexander may refer to:
 Alexander, a character from the King's Quest series of video games
 Alexander Cambridge, 1st Earl of Athlone, born as Prince Alexander of Teck
 Alexander Karađorđević, Prince of Serbia (r. 1842–1858)
 Alexander Mountbatten, 1st Marquess of Carisbrooke, born as Prince Alexander Albert of Battenberg (1886–1960)
 Alexander of Bulgaria, born as Alexander Joseph of Battenberg (1857–1893)
 Alexander I of Serbia (1876–1903), King of Serbia
 Alexander I of Yugoslavia (1888–1934), King of Yugoslavia
 Prince Alexander of Hesse and by Rhine (1823–1888)
 Prince Alexandre of Belgium, Alexander Emmanuel Henry Albert Marie Léopold (1942–2009)
 Prince Alexander of Denmark (1903–1991), later became King Olav V of Norway
 Prince Alexander von Fürstenberg (born 1970)
 Prince Alexander of Georgia (1770–1844)
 Prince Alexander of Hohenlohe-Waldenburg-Schillingsfürst (1794–1849)
 Prince Alexander of Imereti (1674–1711)
 Prince Alexander of Imereti (1760–1780)
 Prince Alexander of Kartli (1726–1791)
 Prince Alexander of Kartli (died 1711)
 Prince Alexander of Kartli (died 1773)
 Prince Alexander of Liechtenstein (1929–2012)
 Willem-Alexander, King of the Netherlands
 Prince Alexander of the Netherlands (1818–1848)
 Prince Alexander of Prussia (1820–1896)
 Prince Alexander Ferdinand of Prussia (1912–1985)
 Prince Alexander Romanov (1929–2002)
 Alexander, Prince of Saxony (born 1954)
 Prince Alexander of Sweden, Duke of Södermanland (born 2016), son of Prince Carl Philip of Sweden, Duke of Värmland and grandson of King Carl XVI Gustaf of Sweden
 Prince Alexander John of Wales (1871), short-lived son of Edward VII
 Alexander, Crown Prince of Yugoslavia (born 1945), head of the House of Karageorgevic
 Prince Alexander of Yugoslavia (born 1982)
 Prince Alexander of Yugoslavia (1924–2016)

A few other princes have borne the name Alexander:

 George V of Hanover (1819–1878)
 Prince Alfred of Edinburgh and Saxe-Coburg and Gotha (1874–1899)
 Prince George, Duke of Kent (1902–1942)
 Prince Richard, Duke of Gloucester (born 1944)
 Prince George of Wales (born 2013)